Allardville is a civil parish in Gloucester County, New Brunswick, Canada,

It is divided for governance purposes into the town of Hautes-Terres in the east and the Chaleur rural district in the west. Hautes-Terres is a member of the Acadian Peninsula Regional Service Commission and the Chaleur RD is a member of the Chaleur RSC.

Prior to the 2023 governance reform, the Hautes-Terres portion formed the local service district of Saint-Sauveur, while the Chaleur RD portion formed the LSD of the parish of Allardville.

Origin of name
The parish was named in honour of Monsignor Jean-Joseph-Auguste Allard, who brought new settlers from the East Bathurst area in 1932.

History
Allardville was erected in 1947 from parts of Bathurst, Saint-Isidore, and Saumarez Parishes. This was the last new parish to be erected in New Brunswick.

Boundaries
Allardville Parish is bounded:
 on the west by the Canadian National Railway line;
 on the north by the southern line of two land grants south of Goodwin Mill Road, prolonged southwesterly to the CNR line and northeasterly to the Tracadie Game Management Area, then taking a right-angle turn to the rear line Tier 1 of the Allardville East Settlement, which runs along the north side of Route 160, before turning northeasterly and following the rear of Tier 1 and its prolongation to about midway between Redpine Brook and Lac St. Coeur;
 on the east by a line southerly from midway between Redpine Brook and Lac St. Coeur along the prolongation of grant lines until it strikes the rear of Range 5 of the Saint Isidore Settlement, which runs along the north side of a different section of Route 160, then along Range 5 to midway between Butte-d'Or Road and the dogleg of Route 160 connecting the sections in Tier 1 and Range 5, then southerly at a right angle along grant lines at the end of Saint Isidore Settlement and their prolongation to the prolongation of the rear line of Range 9 of the Saint Isidore Settlement, which runs along the south side of Rang 9 Road;
 on the south by the prolongation of the rear line of Range 9 southwesterly past the Little South Branch Big Tracadie River to the line between Blocks 3 and 4 of Range 9 of timberland, then at a right angle southerly to the Northumberland County line, then westerly along the county line to the CNR line.

Former governance
The parish's two LSDs sat side-by-side, with the boundary running northwesterly along grant lines about 8.1 kilometres easterly of the junction of Route 134 and Route 160 and prolongated northwesterly and southeasterly to the parish line. Both LSDs assessed for street lighting and community & recreation services in addition to basic LSD services.

Saint-Sauveur (established 1985) was the eastern LSD, taking its name from its westernmost community. The population in 2016 was 673.

Allardville (established 1999) was the western LSD. This LSD actually extends north to included part of Bathurst Parish; census data does not profile the extended area. Allardville was formed by merging three previous entities:

The parish of Allardville (established 1969) originally included the entire parish and allowed residents to assess for fire protection.
Allardville Centre (established 1970) comprised about 650 hectares north and south of the junction of Route 134 and Route 160; it added street lighting to the area.
Allardville Nord (established 1991) was an area with enhanced services that straddled the Allardville-Bathurst parish line, which added street lighting to the area.

Governance reform
Governance reforms planned for 2023 would move Saint-Sauveur to the Acadian Peninsula Regional Service Commission, where it would form a local government entity with the villages of Paquetville and Saint-Isidore and the LSDs of the parish of Paquetville and the parish of Saint-Isidore. Allardville would remain part of the Chaleur RSC and be included in its rural district. These reforms are scheduled to take effect in 2023.

Communities
Communities at least partly within the parish; (brackets) indicate the LSD; italics indicate a name not used on modern provincial government maps
 Allardville (A) is a community at the junction of Route 134 and Route 160
 Allardville East (A) is located on Route 160, east of Allardville
 Beaubois is now part of Saint-Sauveur
 Butte-d'Or (SS) is along Route 363 near the eastern parish line
 Daulnay (A) is along Route 134, south of Allardville
 Jeanne-Mance (A) is along Route 134 and the southernmost community in the parish
 Pokemouche Landing (SS) is along Route 160, near the eastern parish line
 Rang-St-Sauveur is now part of Saint-Sauveur
 Saint-Sauveur (SS) is along Route 160 between Allardville East and Butte-d'Or
 railway points along the western edge of the parish: Bartibog Station, Bruce Siding, Red Pine, Russell

Bodies of water
Bodies of water at least partly within the parish.

 Bartibog River
 Bass River
 Big Eskedelloc River
 Big Tracadie River
 Little Bass River

 Little Eskedelloc River
 Tabusintac River
 Bass River Lake
 East Branch Lake

Conservation areas
Parks, historic sites, and related entities at least partly within the parish.
 Allardville Protected Natural Area
 Bass Brook Protected Natural Area
 Bass River Protected Natural Area
 East Branch Portage River Protected Natural Area
 Lord and Foy Brook Protected Natural Area
 Pisiguit Brook Protected Natural Area
 Red Pine Brook Protected Natural Area
 Tabusintac River Protected Natural Area
 Tracadie River Game Management Area

Demographics

Population
Revised census figures based on the 2023 local governance reforms have not been released.

Language

See also
List of parishes in New Brunswick

Notes

References

Former local service districts of New Brunswick
Parishes of Gloucester County, New Brunswick